Aldisa pikokai is a species of sea slug, a dorid nudibranch, a marine gastropod mollusk in the family Cadlinidae.

Distribution 
This species was described from Hawaii. It has subsequently been reported from the Marshall Islands.

References

Cadlinidae
Gastropods described in 1982